Subergorgia is a genus of soft corals belonging to the family Subergorgiidae.

Species
The following species are recognized in the genus Subergorgia:
 Subergorgia compressa Gray, 1857
 Subergorgia koellikeri Wright & Studer, 1889
 Subergorgia mexicana (Koch, 1878)
 Subergorgia muriceoides Stiasny, 1937
 Subergorgia nuttingi Stiasny, 1937
 Subergorgia patula (Ellis & Solander, 1786)
 Subergorgia rubra (Thomson, 1905)
 Subergorgia suberosa (Pallas, 1766)
 Subergorgia thomsoni (Nutting, 1911)
 Subergorgia verriculata (Esper, 1791)

References

 Biolib
 WoRMS

Subergorgiidae
Octocorallia genera